Lillian Glacier was located in the Olympic Mountains in Olympic National Park in the U.S. state of Washington. The remnants of the glacier are in a cirque below McCartney Peak. Between 1905 and 2010, the Lillian Glacier melted away most likely because of global warming.

See also
List of glaciers in the United States

References

Glaciers of the Olympic Mountains
Glaciers of Jefferson County, Washington
Glaciers of Washington (state)